Myeloid and erythroid nuclear termination stage-specific protein (MENT) is a member of the serpin family of protease inhibitors, and participates in DNA and chromatin condensation. Alongside its ability to condense chromatin, MENT is also an effective inhibitor of the proteases cathepsin K, cathepsin L, and cathepsin V, all of which are cysteine proteases. As such, although MENT is structurally classified as a member of the serpin family, it is functionally termed a "cross-class inhibitor," as it is a cysteine rather than a serine protease inhibitor.

References

External links
 The MEROPS online database for peptidases and their inhibitors: I04.033

Serine protease inhibitors